Boyanka Kostova (born 10 May 1993) is a Bulgarian-born naturalized Azerbaijani weightlifter. She competed at the 2012 Summer Olympics in the women's 58 kg, finishing in fifth place.

Career
In June 2016, following the Russian doping scandal, it was announced by IWF that retests of the samples taken from the 2012 Olympics indicated that Kostova had tested positive for prohibited substances, namely Dehydrochloromethyltestosterone and Stanozolol, meaning she lost all results and medals earned from the date of the sample in 2012 to 2016. In November 2016 the IOC Disciplinary Commission disqualified Kostova from the 2012 Olympic Games.

In May 2021, shortly after the European Championships in which she took gold, Kostova tested positive for the banned substance Stanozolol again. In October 2021, she was banned for eight years as it was her second doping violation.

In the beginning of 2022 she was arrested for drug traffic in Bulgaria. She was sentenced to 3 years of prison, but her sentence was shorten until November 2022 in order to start a coaching career and study to NSA under Lachezar Kishkilov, who was her coach, surveillance.

References

External links
 

Azerbaijani female weightlifters
Living people
Olympic weightlifters of Azerbaijan
Weightlifters at the 2012 Summer Olympics
Bulgarian emigrants to Azerbaijan
World Weightlifting Championships medalists
Naturalized citizens of Azerbaijan
Azerbaijani people of Bulgarian descent
Weightlifters at the 2010 Summer Youth Olympics
Bulgarian female weightlifters
1993 births
Azerbaijani sportspeople in doping cases
Doping cases in weightlifting
Youth Olympic gold medalists for Bulgaria
European Weightlifting Championships medalists